Nwankwo Obiora (born 12 July 1991) is a Nigerian footballer who plays as a defensive midfielder for Portuguese club Chaves.

Club career
Obiora began his career with Lagos based club ECO FC, before he signed for Heartland. He was loaned to Wikki Tourists in July 2008.

He then left Heartland to sign a contract with Real Murcia on 11 May 2009 that ran through 30 June 2010.

Internazionale
On 28 November 2009 it was announced that Internazionale signed Obiora from Eco FC. At first the youngster was a part of Inter's primavera squad managed by Fulvio Pea.
Obiora made his first-team debut in a UEFA Champions League match against Tottenham in London, coming on as a substitute for the injured Sulley Muntari in the 53rd minute.

Parma
After not making an impact at the Milan club, Nwankwo Obiora moved to Parma on 31 January 2011 in a co-ownership deal for €300,000. The deal was renewed in June 2011 and again in June 2012. He was loaned to Calcio Padova in 2012–13 season. Parma subsidized Padova for €200,000 in terms of premi di valorizzazione.

CFR Cluj
On 6 February 2013, Romanian champions CFR Cluj announced that they brought the midfielder on a temporary basis, with a buyout clause to make the move permanent in the summer. In June 2013 Parma also purchased the remain 50% registration rights of Nwankwo from Inter (as part of the return of Galimberti and Mella to Inter), in order to re-sell the registration rights to Cluj for free.

Académica
On 23 July 2014, after a small stint with Córdoba in Segunda División, Obiora signed a three-year deal with Primeira Liga side Académica de Coimbra. He made his debut in a 1–1 home draw against Sporting CP. Obiora scored his first goal for Académica on 1 November, in a 1–1 draw against Moreirense.

Levadiakos
On 15 September 2016, Levadiakos officially announced the signing of Nwankwo.

Boavista
He signed for Boavista for the 2018–19 season. In March 2019 he talked about how injuries had affected his earlier career.

International career
He was a member of the Nigeria U-20 squad which took part at the 2009 FIFA U-20 World Cup in Egypt, the 2009 WAFU U-20 Championship, and the 2009 African Youth Championship in Rwanda.

He was called up to Nigeria's 23-man squad for the 2013 Africa Cup of Nations.

Honours

Club
Internazionale
Supercoppa Italiana: 2010
FIFA Club World Cup: 2010

International
Nigeria
Africa Cup of Nations: 2013

Footnotes

References

External links

1989 births
Living people
Association football midfielders
Nigerian footballers
Nigeria international footballers
Nigeria under-20 international footballers
Inter Milan players
Parma Calcio 1913 players
A.S. Gubbio 1910 players
Calcio Padova players
CFR Cluj players
Córdoba CF players
Associação Académica de Coimbra – O.A.F. players
Levadiakos F.C. players
Boavista F.C. players
G.D. Chaves players
Nigerian expatriate footballers
Expatriate footballers in Spain
Nigerian expatriate sportspeople in Spain
Expatriate footballers in Italy
Nigerian expatriate sportspeople in Italy
Expatriate footballers in Romania
Nigerian expatriate sportspeople in Romania
Expatriate footballers in Portugal
Expatriate footballers in Greece
Segunda División players
Serie A players
Serie B players
Liga I players
Primeira Liga players
Liga Portugal 2 players
2011 CAF U-23 Championship players
2013 Africa Cup of Nations players
Africa Cup of Nations-winning players
Sportspeople from Kaduna
Nigerian expatriate sportspeople in Portugal
Nigerian expatriate sportspeople in Greece